is an actress, singer, essayist, and novelist. She works through the Last Scene talent management firm. She attended Meiji University Nakano Junior and Senior High School before transferring to Tokyo Municipal Yoyogi High School, where she graduated.

Brief biography
In 1981, Kawada making an impression in the Shueisha "Miss Young Jump" Grand Prix, she appeared as a regular on the popular TBS television show Tanokin Zenryoku Tokyu. The song was used in a commercial for House Foods. In that same year, she made her acting debut with the main heroine role in the TBS drama .

Kawada published her novel  through Kosaidō in 1996, and the novel was made into a film later that year. In 1999, she married one of her fans, Yūrei Yanagi. She then released two self-produced photo books which featured nude images of herself in 2000. In recent years, she has worked with her husband producing short films.

External links

JMDb profile (in Japanese)
Profile at Last Scene

Japanese actresses
1965 births
Living people
Singers from Tokyo
Japanese essayists
20th-century Japanese novelists
21st-century Japanese novelists
20th-century essayists
21st-century essayists